The 1959 World Table Tennis Championships men's doubles was the 25th edition of the men's doubles championship.
Ichiro Ogimura and Teruo Murakami won the title after defeating Ladislav Štípek and Ludvík Vyhnanovský in the final by three sets to two.

Results

See also
List of World Table Tennis Championships medalists

References

-